Iturea (Itouraía) is the Greek name of a Levantine region north of Galilee during the Late Hellenistic and early Roman periods. It extended from Mount Lebanon across the plain of Marsyas to the Anti-Lebanon Mountains in Syria, with its centre in Chalcis.

Itureans
The Itureans were a semi-nomadic tribe who became sedentarized in the Hellenistic period. The exact origin of the Itureans is disputed. Most scholars identified them as Arabs, while some believed that they were Aramaean people.

They first rose to power in the aftermath of the decline of the Seleucids in the 2nd century BCE. Then, from their base around Mount Lebanon and the Beqaa Valley, they came to dominate vast stretches of Syrian territory, and appear to have penetrated into northern parts of Israel as far as the Galilee.

Etymology
Several etymologies have been proposed for the name Iturea and much uncertainty still remains.

Based on the Septuagint translation of 1Ch 5:19 several commentators including Gesenius, John Gill and William Muir equated the Itureans with Jetur one of the former Hagrite encampments, named after a son of Ishmael. Later scholars who propose a late origin for the Biblical texts continued to equate the names but viewed the writers of the Bible as basing the Biblical name on that of the Itureans of later centuries. More recent scholars have dismissed such direct relationships between the Biblical Jetur and the Itureans: The account of the Hagrites places Jetur east of Gilead and describes the end of that tribe which was conquered by the Israelites in the days of Saul, whereas Iturea has been confirmed to be north of Galilee and the Itureans first appear in the Hellenistic period with their location only being referred to as Iturea in the Roman period. Although Jetur is translated Itouraion (Ιτουραιων) in 1Ch 5:19, the rendering of the name is not consistent across the Septuagint with the occurrences in Ge 25:15 and 1Ch 1:31 being transliterated Ietour (Ιετουρ) and Iettour (Ιεττουρ) respectively. The translation Itouraion in 1Ch 5:19 (if not an error) would thus be a reinterpretation by the translator of the name of this ancient tribe as referring to a contemporary people. Moreover, in Josephus where both names are mentioned, Jetur (Ιετουρ-) is rendered differently in Greek to Iturea (Ιτουρ-). Similarly in the Vulgate the two localities have different Latin names (Iathur for Jetur and Itureae for Iturea) showing that writers of antiquity did not view the names as the same. Eupolemus used the term Itureans to refer to people from the Biblical region of Aram-Zobah not Jetur when describing the wars of King David.

Smith's Bible Dictionary attempted to equate the modern Arabic region name Jedur (جدور) with both Jetur and Iturea however the Arabic j (ج) corresponds to Hebrew g (ג) and not y (י), and Arabic d (د) does not correspond to Hebrew ṭ (ט) or Greek t (τ) and the mainstream view is that Jedur is instead the Biblical Gedor (גדור).

David Urquhart linked the Itureans with Aturea a name for the region of Nineveh, a variant of Assyria, suggesting that the Itureans were originally Assyrians, also implying a connection with the Druze living in the region in his time. (The name "Druze" is however unrelated to "Iturean".) 

Ernest Axel Knauf related Iturea to the Safaitic name Yaẓur (יט׳ור, يظور) which is rendered Yaṭur (יטור) in Nabatean Aramaic. Before being established as the name of a people (Al-Yaẓur or Yaṭureans), this name is found as a personal name, in particular that of a Nabatean prince with a brother Zabud whose name may be connected with that of the Zabadaeans, another Nabatean tribe who together with the Itureans had been conquered by the Hasmoneans. Yaẓur in Safaitic inscriptions is seemingly a cognate of the Biblical name Jetur (Yeṭur, יטור) and is possibly derived from its original form. If this is the case then Biblical Jetur would indirectly be the origin of the name Iturea although denoting a different region and people centuries before. Whether the names are indeed related hinges on their original meanings. The Gesenius' Hebrew-Chaldee Lexicon suggests that Jetur means "enclosure" related to the personal name Ṭur (טור) and the word ṭirah (טירה) denoting an encampment and explicitly used for the Ishmaelite encampments. This would contradict their being a connection with Yaẓur as in Arabic which like Safaitic preserves the distinction between the ẓ (ظ) and ṭ (ط) sounds, this root is found with ṭ and not ẓ. Thus if the Itureans derived their name from Jetur, the people known as the Yaẓur in Safaitic inscriptions would have been a different people, possibly only a small family group, while if the Itureans derived their name from Yaẓur there would be no connection with Jetur.

Hitchcock's Bible Names Dictionary however suggests that Jetur means "order; succession; mountainous". A connection with "mountain" (more precisely "rock fortress") may refer to the Hebrew word ṣur (צור), a root which survives in Arabic ẓar (ظر) meaning "flint", the sound ẓ (ظ) having become ṣ (צ) in Hebrew. The spelling Yeṭur (יטור) would thus be the result of an Aramaic spelling convention in which the ẓ is represented by ṭet (ט) rather than its true Hebrew reflex ṣadi (צ). If this meaning is correct, then a linguistic connection between the names Jetur and Yaẓur remains a possibility, however no occurrence of an Aramaic spelling of this nature in the Hebrew Bible is known even for names in the Aramaic and Arabic realms and the expected Hebrew spelling would be Yaṣur (יצור). The root ṭur (טור) having a basic meaning of row, line or fence (hence "order; succession"), also refers to a mountain range thus also providing a connection with "mountain".

A further phonetic complication exists in equating the name Iturea with either Jetur or Yaẓur. Yaẓur as a personal name is consistently found as Iatour- (Ιατουρ-) in Greek inscriptions. In Iatour- the initial Greek iota (Ι) is consonantal representing the initial y sound of Yaẓur. Similarly, in the transliterations Ietour- (Ιετουρ) and Iettour ((Ιεττουρ)) for Jetur in the Septuagint, the iota represents an original y - the Hebrew letter yod (י). However, in Itour- the iota is a vowel suggesting that it represents an i vowel in the original Semitic name rather than the consonant y. An initial iota may also be used for the syllable yi, however such a reading of Itour- (Ιτουρ-) does not produce a meaningful form and no tradition of pronouncing it as such exists. As a vowel is always preceded by a consonant in Semitic words, the initial consonant would have been one of the four guttural consonants dropped in Greek transliteration (א,ה,ח,ע). This contradicts derivations from either Jetur or Yaẓur and is the basis of several alternative etymologies proposed by John Lightfoot.

Lightfoot considered a possible derivation from the root for "ten" (I.e. `-s-r, עשר) based on identification of Iturea with Decapolis ("ten cities"). However he does not provide a grammatical form that would be vocalized as Itour- and ultimately dismisses this possibility as it involves an unattested sound change of s (ש) into t (ט). Decapolis is also a distinct region to Iturea.

Lightfoot also considered derivations from proposed terms whose meanings he gives as "wealth" (hittur, i.e. היתור) and "diggings" (chitture, i.e. חתורי) He favored the derivation from chitture noting the descriptions of the landscape. Derivations from hittur or chitture are problematic however. The Semitic tav (ת) is normally transliterated by theta (θ) in Greek, not tau (τ). Additionally, although the consonants he (ה) and chet (ח) are dropped in Greek transliteration, they survive as a rough breathing provided to the initial vowel and are transliterated by "h" in Latin. However no tradition of a rough breathing in the pronunciation of Itour- exists nor is Iturea ever given an initial h in Latin. A further difficulty is that while the roots of these two words are known, the forms which Lightfoot has used are conjectural.

Lightfoot also proposed a derivation from `iṭur (עטור) meaning "crowning" (or "decoration") Unlike his other proposals, this word is well attested and remains a plausible derivation as it would be transliterated as Itour- (Ιτουρ) in Greek. Regarding this possibility, Lightfoot notes familiarly of the notion of a country crowned with plenty in Talmudic writings.<ref>'John Lightfoot, 'A Commentary on the New Testament from the Talmud and Hebraica, Cambridge and London, 1658-1674, Chorographical Notes, Chapter 1: Of the places mentioned in Luke 3, Iturea 
</ref> However the name was first an ethnonym before becoming a toponym, and in the Josippon the Iturean nation is referred to as 'iṭuraios (איטוריאוס) in Hebrew rendered with an aleph (א) not an ayin (ע) showing that Jewish tradition, at least as preserved by the writer of the Josippon, did not view the name as being related to `iṭur (עטור) meaning "crowning".

In the Syriac Peshittas which are the texts closest in time to the period in which the tetrarchy of Iturea existed that provide a Semitic form of the name, it is called 'iṭuriya' (ܐܝܛܘܪܝܐ) rendered with an initial alap and yodh (ܐܝ). This may arise from either an initial 'i syllable or initial yi syllable in earlier Hebrew or Aramaic. As the latter does not produce a meaningful form it suggests that the original syllable is 'i indicating an initial aleph (א) in the original. This accords with the usage of aleph in the Josippon and suggests that the original Semitic form of the name was 'iṭur (איטור or אטור) or 'iẓur (איט׳ור or אט׳ור). The latter would share a common root with Hebrew ṣur (צור) however the use of a ṭ (ט) not an ṣ (צ) in the Josippon indicates that the word was not understood as such by the author and indeed no grammatical form that would be vocalized as 'iẓur is known for this root. The former possibility 'iṭur (איטור or אטור) is the noun form of the known word 'iṭer (אטר) meaning "bound" or "shut up" in Hebrew  ultimately sharing a common etymology with the word ṭirah (טירה) used for an encampment. A Nabatean personal name written 'i-ṭ-r-w (אטרו) based on one or the other of these roots is attested. In Aramaic however the base word ṭur (טור) is used particularly for a line of mountains rather than a boundary of an encampment and the understanding of the name Itureans in Syriac is "mountain dwellers" according with the location of their settlement being the Mount Lebanon region.

History

In 105 BCE, Aristobulus I campaigned against Iturea, and added a great part of it to Judea, annexing the Galilee to the Hasmonean kingdom. Josephus cites a passage from Timagenes excerpted by Strabo which recounts that Aristobulus was:
'very serviceable to the Jews, for he added a country to them, and obtained a part of the nation of the Itureans for them, and bound to them by the bond of the circumcision of their genitals.Shayne J.D.Cohen, 'Respect for Judaism by Gentiles According to Josephus,' in Shayne J.D. Cohen (ed.) The Significance of Yavneh and Other Essays in Jewish Hellenism, Mohr Siebeck, 2012 p.200.

Whether the Hasmoneans circumcised the Itureans and other populations against their will is uncertain: Strabo asserts that they simply created a confederation with such tribes based on the common bond of circumcision, which may be more plausible, though their policy appears to have been one of aggressive Judaizing.

The Iturean kingdom appears to have had its centre in the kingdom of Ptolemy, son of Mennaeus (Mennæus), whose residence was at Chalcis(?) and who reigned 85-40 BCE. Ptolemy was succeeded by his son Lysanias, called by Dio Cassius (xlix. 32) "king of the Itureans." About 23 BCE, Iturea with the adjacent provinces fell into the hands of a chief named Zenodorus (Josephus, l.c. xv. 10, § 1; idem, B. J. i. 20, § 4). Three years later, at the death of Zenodorus, Augustus gave Iturea to Herod the Great, who in turn bequeathed it to his son Philip (Josephus, Ant. xv. 10, § 3).

The area and the Itureans are mentioned only once in the New Testament, in the Luke iii. 1, but are frequently described by pagan writers such as Strabo, Pliny the Elder, and Cicero. The Jewish writer Josephus also described them. They were known to the Romans as a predatory people, and were appreciated by them for their great skill in archery. They played a notable role in the defense of Jerusalem. A branch of the Itureans were allegedly conquered by the Hasmonean king Alexander Jannaeus (r. 103 to 76 BCE) and, according to Josephus, forcibly converted to Judaism.Seán Freyne, 'Galilean Studies: Old Issues and New Questions,' in Jürgen Zangenberg, Harold W. Attridge, Dale B. Martin, (eds.)Religion, Ethnicity, and Identity in Ancient Galilee: A Region in Transition, Mohr Siebeck, 2007 pp.13-32, p.25.

Many Christian theologians, among them Eusebius, taking into consideration the above-cited passage of Luke, place Iturea near Trachonitis. According to Josephus, the Iturean kingdom lay north of Galilee. That Itureans dwelt in the region of Mount Lebanon is confirmed by an inscription of about the year 6 CE (Ephemeris Epigraphica, 1881, pp. 537–542), in which Quintus Aemilius Secundus relates that he was sent by Quirinius against the Itureans in Mount Lebanon. In 38 Caligula gave Iturea to a certain Soemus, who is called by Dio Cassius (lix. 12) and by Tacitus (Annals, xii. 23) "king of the Itureans." After the death of Soemus (49) his kingdom was incorporated into the province of Syria (Tacitus, l.c.). After this incorporation the Itureans furnished soldiers for the Roman army; and the designations Ala I Augusta Ituraeorum and Cohors I Augusta Ituraeorum are met with in the inscriptions (Ephemeris Epigraphica, 1884, p. 194).

References

E. A. Myers, The Ituraeans and the Roman Near East (Cambridge, Cambridge University Press, 2010).
D. Herman, Catalogue of the Iturean coins. Israel Numismatic Review 1:51-72.
 Said, Salah, "Two New Greek Inscriptions with the name ϒTWR from Umm al-Jimāl," Palestine Exploration Quarterly'', 138,2 (2006), 125-132.
 WRIGHT, N.L. 2013: "Ituraean coinage in context." Numismatic Chronicle 173: 55-71. (available online here)

Notes

Geographic history of Syria
Ancient Lebanon
Ancient Syria
New Testament regions